Akkan Wali (also spelled as Akkanwali or Akanwali) is a village in the Mansa district of Indian Punjab. Lakhmir Wala, Kot Dhamu and Chachohar are the nearby villages.

References 

Villages in Mansa district, India